Signalness Lake is a lake in Pope County, in the U.S. state of Minnesota.

Signalness Lake was named for Olaus Signalness, a Norwegian settler.

See also
List of lakes in Minnesota

References

Lakes of Minnesota
Lakes of Pope County, Minnesota